Antonio Lupi (1598–1668) was a Roman Catholic prelate who served as Bishop of Treviso (1645–1668).

Biography
Antonio Lupi was born in 1598 in Bergomo, Italy.
On 21 Aug 1645, he was appointed during the papacy of Pope Innocent X as Bishop of Treviso.
On 8 Oct 1645, he was consecrated bishop by Giovanni Giacomo Panciroli, Cardinal-Priest of Santo Stefano al Monte Celio, with Alfonso Gonzaga, Titular Archbishop of Rhodus, and Ranuccio Scotti Douglas, Bishop of Borgo San Donnino, serving as co-consecrators. 
He served as Bishop of Treviso until his death on 4 Jan 1668.

References

External links and additional sources
  (for Chronology of Bishops) 
  (for Chronology of Bishops) 

17th-century Roman Catholic bishops in the Republic of Venice
Bishops appointed by Pope Innocent X
1598 births
1668 deaths